A Very British Airline is a British documentary television series that was first broadcast on BBC Two between 2 and 16 June 2014. The three-part series goes behind the scenes of British Airways with narration by Stephen Mangan.

Production
The series was commissioned by Janice Hadlow, controller of BBC Two, and Emma Willis, controller of BBC documentaries. In December 2013 Nick Catliff, Managing Director for Lion Television, said: "It took a long time to persuade BA to give us access but we are now in the thick of filming."

Lion Television, the production company behind A Very British Airline, was first associated with British Airways when one of its jumbo jets was dissected for BBC Two's Engineering Giants. Lion Television managed to persuade British Airways to show its cabin crew, engineers and boardroom.

Episodes

Episode 1
The first episode in the series looks at British Airways' efforts to escape the financial crisis it has been suffering in recent years, featuring the introduction of the Airbus A380 into its fleet, and cameras go behind 'millionaires door' at Heathrow's Terminal 5 to see what is experienced by the airline's first class passengers. The episode follows the preparation of the first A380 to join the fleet, and then its first flight to Los Angeles. The episode also follows the airline's new cabin crew recruits as they begin their training, and the staff at the British Airways HQ at Waterside with the task of juggling around aircraft when maintenance overruns or when unexpected problems occur.

The cabin crew training aspect of this episode resulted in bad reviews and opinions of British Airways' disciplining methods, due to the basis on which trainees were issued with warnings, and ultimately removed from the course, and the attitude of the trainers. One trainee, Patrick, had his contract terminated due to receiving a fourth and final written warning for arriving two minutes late to a session. He said had had to pay 'thousands of pounds' to join the course, had relocated and left a previous job to attend in the training. A fellow trainee described him as 'reliable & hard working'  and that it was 'gutting' for him to have put in so much hard work. He described the intensity of the training as 'almost like being in the military'.

Episode 2
In this episode cameras follow the airline as it launches a new route to Chengdu, China, and investigate the company's major operations out of New York City. It follows a new manager as he begins his new role at New York JFK, and the airline's Chinese airports manager. The episode looks back on the days of supersonic flight, when Concorde was the centre of British Airways' fleet, flying the airline's Blue Ribbon route between London and New York. We also find out which cabin crew recruits have managed to successfully complete their training, with Jodi receiving her fourth and final 'snapshot' just 3 days before the end of her course. This episode showed footage of Jodi being escorted off the property for not wearing enough lipstick by lead trainer Si Hunter Jones. Another trainee was issued a snapshot for being late for training, despite the fact that the trainers were aware of a serious incident that had occurred on the M25 causing her journey to be delayed. Once again, this episode resulted in bad reviews and it further revealed to the public the cruel culture at British Airways.

Episode 3
Having already followed British Airways' cabin crew recruits, the final episode shows the first few cadet pilots to train with the airline on its new Future pilot programme in their final months of the course. The episode also takes a look at what it takes to manage the world's most congested airport, and the efforts of the staff to reduce delays. We see what happens to our bags after check in at the airport, and also what happens to aircraft in the turnaround between flights.

This episode received very positive reviews, unlike the previous two episodes.

Critical reception
The Daily Telegraph described the documentary as a "missed opportunity" and that it was "remarkably undynamic". The Guardian described it as the "latest in a genre that can be hard to watch without flinching", saying that it presented "an unflattering snapshot of the UK psyche".

The airline's training of cabin crew has been described as cruel, 'verging on bullying' and that the so-called 'snapshots' (written warnings), which will result in the trainee's contract being terminated should 4 snapshots be accumulated, were issued for 'petty' reasons, such as being 2 minutes late for training, and in trainee Jodi's case, not wearing enough lipstick. The trainers were described as 'arrogant, insincere and petty'.

However, in another review, the documentary was praised, saying "If this is one big PR campaign, then it really is working", and, "A better understanding of what's going on behind the scenes will make me think twice before blaming the airline outright".

Generally, the final episode received much more positive reviews, providing more insight into how the airline actually manages its operations at Heathrow.

International broadcast
The series premiered in Australia on 19 June 2015 on The LifeStyle Channel and was watched by 53,000 viewers, making it the seventh most watched program on subscription television in Australia for the evening.

See also
Inside KFC
Inside Claridge's
The Route Masters: Running London's Roads
Iceland Foods: Life in the Freezer Cabinet

References

External links
 
 

2014 British television series debuts
2014 British television series endings
2010s British reality television series
BBC television documentaries
British Airways
Documentary television series about aviation
English-language television shows